Gary Robert Malarkey (born 23 May 1953) is a former Australian rules footballer, who represented East Perth (WAFL), Geelong (VFL/AFL), Geelong West (VFA), Western Australia, and Victoria.

A list of regular opponents that included Hudson, Quinlan, Templeton, Blight and Roach would daunt most defenders but for the hard working and dedicated Gary Malarkey it was all in a day's work. An All Australian and a Victorian as well as West Australian representative prior to state of origin football, Malarkey was recognised as the most effective full back of his era.

East Perth
Malarkey was born at Armadale, but learnt the Australian game at Trinity College and joined East Perth at the age of 18. Although he debuted on a half forward flank in the second game of 1971, he could only notch 2 senior games that year. Tried in defence the following year, he quickly demonstrated his outstanding potential by appearing in all 23 games and lined up at full back in the Royals 1972 premiership team.

Although not tall for a key defender (185 cm) Malarkey was extremely strong and he showed an early propensity for close checking defence, revelling in tough man on man duels. He had excellent anticipation and good pace over the first 20 meters as well as being a strong mark and superb kick, often challenging the centre circle with his punts from the full back line. In his second full season (1973) Malarkey captured East Perth's fairest and best trophy and represented WA against South Australia. He was signed by Geelong but East Perth imposed a minimum service requirement of 100 league games before a clearance would be granted. He thus stayed for a further 3 years before finally crossing to the Cats in 1977.

Geelong
At Geelong, Gary Malarkey was an immediate and outstanding success in his customary full back position and represented Victoria. He was widely recognised as the finest full back in Australia over the following 10 seasons and was remarkably consistent in one of the toughest roles in Victorian football. In 1983, the Geelong and now AFL historian Col Hutchinson said of Malarkey in his book Cats Tales that he was "one of Geelong's most effective full backs and probably the strongest defender to ever represent the team. His great concentration, solid marking, effective spoiling tactics, courage, pace and superb kicking resulted in nightmares for opposing forwards. Few players have emulated his consistency."

Gary Malarkey was a regular WA state of origin representative whilst at Geelong and gained all Australian selection after the 1979 State of Origin carnival. He was named in the VFL Team of the Year in 1983 and he was also runner up in Geelong's fairest and best award that season. When he decided, at this point, to return home to Perth to finish his career, Geelong. in a measure of their appreciation, granted him life membership despite his 143 games being 7 games short of the qualifying tally. Unfortunately no agreement could be reached with East Perth, or any other WAFL club and Malarkey returned to Geelong. He quickly forced his way back into the side but a shoulder reconstruction two years later brought an unfortunate end to a long and distinguished senior career. He had played 283 senior games but later had a final playing stint at the Geelong West club in the Victorian Football Association and he was the last coach of that club in 1988.

Gary wore the Cats famous number 5 guernsey previously worn by another legendary Western Australian, Graham "Polly" Farmer, but after Gary's premature retirement during the 1984 pre-season the number 5 had been allocated to Gary Ablett. After a reshuffle of numbers Malarkey was allocated the number 6 guernsey previously worn by Rod Waddell, which he wore until his retirement in 1986.

After football
Gary Malarkey later returned to WA and is now a distinguished member of the staff at the school that gave him his start in football – Trinity College. His students may well gain inspiration from the knowledge that years of perseverance, hard work and dedication by their master have been rewarded with well deserved induction into the WA Football Hall of Fame. Along with Karrene Mclernon, he runs the Indigenous program at Trinity College.

References 
 Gary Robert MALARKEY from WA Football Hall of Fame.
 http://www.liquidrock.bizhosting.com/gmalarkey.htm
 League Football in Victoria – 1980–81 – VFL Publication of Statistics and Facts, Fourth revised edition 1981 published by the Victorian Football League (Australian Football League)

1953 births
Living people
All-Australians (1953–1988)
Australian rules footballers from Western Australia
East Perth Football Club players
Geelong Football Club players
Geelong West Football Club players
Geelong West Football Club coaches
West Australian Football Hall of Fame inductees
Western Australian State of Origin players
People educated at Trinity College, Perth
Indigenous Australian players of Australian rules football